Munshiganj Sadar is an upazila of Munshiganj District in the Division of Dhaka, Bangladesh.

History

In 1971

On 29 March 1971, days after the start of the Bangladesh Liberation War, people of Munshiganj raided the armoury and captured arms and ammunition, which they used to resist the Pakistan Army. The people of Narayanganj and Munshiganj together resisted an attack of the Pakistan Army on 31 March. The Pakistan Army killed some youths at Kewar on 14 May.

Demographics
As of the 1991 Bangladesh census, Munshiganj district, formerly a subdivision under Dhaka district, was established in 1984. It consists of 6 upazilas, 67 union parishads, 662 mouzas, 906 villages, 18 wards, 73 mahallas and 2 municipalities.

Administration
Munshiganj Sadar Upazila is divided into Mirkadim Municipality, Munshiganj Municipality, and nine union parishads: Adhara, Bajrajogini, Banglabazar, Charkewar, Mohakali, Mollakandi, Panchashar, Rampal, and Shiloy. The union parishads are subdivided into 94 mauzas and 196 villages.

Mirkadim Municipality and Munshiganj Municipality are each subdivided into 9 wards.

Education

There are six colleges in the upazila: Government Haraganga College, Mirkadim Hazi Amzad Ali (Degree) College, Munshigonj College, Munshigonj Government Mohila College, President Prof. DR. Iajuddin Ahmed Residential Model School & College, and Rampal College.

According to Banglapedia, A. V. G. M. Government Girls' High School, founded in 1892, Bajrajogini J. K. High School (1883), Basirannesa High School (1972), Rikaby Bazar GIRLS' High School,	Binodpur Ramkumar High School (1919), Edrakpur High School (1970), K. K. Government Institution (1942), Munshiganj M. L. High School (1885), and Rampal N. B. M. High School (1933) Mirkadim Hazi Amzad Ali High School are notable secondary schools.

Notable residents
 A M Nurul Islam, civil servant, attended Munshiganj High School.

See also
Upazilas of Bangladesh
Districts of Bangladesh
Divisions of Bangladesh

References

Upazilas of Munshiganj District